Bellefonte Area High School (previously known as Bellefonte High School)  is a high school serving Bellefonte, Pennsylvania.
     “During the height of airmail operations in Bellefonte in 1925, as many as fifteen people worked there full-time. By 1926, though, powerful long-range aircraft were able to fly directly from New York to Cleveland, bypassing Bellefonte. The terminal was relegated to the status of emergency field only. All other intermediary cities lost their regular service too: Bryan, Iowa City, North Platte, Rawlins, and Rock Springs.
     Today, the site of Bellefonte airmail terminal, formerly the Beaver farm, is now the Bellefonte Area Senior High School. A single green, metal sign identifies what happened there eighty years ago.” [Mavericks of the Sky, The First Daring Pilots of the U.S. Air Mail, Rosenberg & Macaulay, 2007]

Facilities
In 2011, several energy companies worked together to install a photovoltaic solar array on the roof of Bellefonte Area High School.

Notable people
Bellefonte has graduated several figures notable on the state level. Anna Keichline, Pennsylvania's first female architect, graduated from Bellefonte High School in 1906. Pennsylvania's 21st governor, Daniel H. Hastings, served as principal of the school in the late 1860s.

Jeremy Rose was a top wrestler at Bellefonte High before he went on to be a horse jockey. He and his horse, Afleet Alex, won the Belmont Stakes and Preakness Stakes in 2005, receiving the Best Jockey ESPY Award that year.

References

Schools in Centre County, Pennsylvania
Public high schools in Pennsylvania